Quasicyclotosaurus is an extinct genus of mastodonsauroid temnospondyl. It had a closed otic notch.

See also
 Prehistoric amphibian
 List of prehistoric amphibians

References

Capitosaurs
Triassic temnospondyls of North America
Fossil taxa described in 2000
Prehistoric amphibian genera